"Twerk It Like Miley" (officially on cover as #TwerkItLikeMiley) is a 2014 song by American singer Brandon Beal featuring Danish singer Christopher.
The song produced by Danish DJ Hedegaard was released on 5 May 2014 on Universal Music Denmark and Then We Take the World, reaching number one on Tracklisten, the official Danish Singles Chart on its first week of release staying there for just one week. The music video directed by Morten Winther also became popular with many references to Miley Cyrus.

Background
The title refers to American singer Miley Cyrus and her twerking incident when in March 2013, she posted a video on Facebook which featured her performing a twerking routine while wearing a unicorn suit, to the 2011 single "Wop" by J. Dash. Her "Wop" video would go to become viral and create a lot of controversy and parodies. 

The song lyrics refers to this actual video as Brandon Beal asks from his girl to behave like Miley in that video: "I know, you wore them jeans so I can see that thong [repeat] / So pop it like Miley / and don't forget that tongue [repeat] / So when the beat beat beat beat drop, get your ass on the floor / Start twerking like Miley".

Charts

References

2014 singles
2014 songs
Christopher (singer) songs
Number-one singles in Denmark
Universal Music Group singles
Song articles with missing songwriters
Songs written by Brandon Beal
Songs written by Hedegaard (DJ)
Songs about musicians
Songs about actors
Songs based on actual events
Miley Cyrus